William Jay Riley (March 11, 1947 – January 27, 2023) was a United States circuit judge of the United States Court of Appeals for the Eighth Circuit.

Education and background 
Riley received a Bachelor of Arts degree from the University of Nebraska and earned his Juris Doctor at the University of Nebraska–Lincoln College of Law. Following graduation, he was a law clerk to Eighth Circuit Judge Donald Lay, and then he was in private practice until his appointment to the Eighth Circuit. From 2006 to 2023, he taught as an adjunct professor at the Creighton University School of Law, and at University of Nebraska–Lincoln College of Law.

Federal judicial service 
On May 23, 2001, he was nominated by President George W. Bush to a seat vacated by Judge C. Arlen Beam. He was swiftly confirmed 97–0 by the United States Senate just over two months later on August 2, 2001. He received his commission on August 3, 2001. He assumed senior status on June 30, 2017.

Personal life and death 
Riley died on January 27, 2023, at the age of 75.

References

External links

1947 births
2023 deaths
21st-century American judges
Creighton University faculty
Judges of the United States Court of Appeals for the Eighth Circuit
People from Lincoln, Nebraska
United States court of appeals judges appointed by George W. Bush
University of Nebraska–Lincoln alumni
University of Nebraska College of Law alumni